Pokhrama (formerly known as Pokhrawan) is a village in the Lakhisarai district of Bihar, India. It is a part of the Surajgarha Block Development. People across India gather in the village during Chhath Puja, a major Hindu festival. The village has one Gramin Post Office Branch under Kajra Sub-Office.

References

Villages in Lakhisarai district